Tin(II) sulfide is a chemical compound of tin and sulfur. The chemical formula is SnS. Its natural occurrence concerns herzenbergite (α-SnS), a rare mineral. At elevated temperatures above 905 K, SnS undergoes a second order phase transition to β-SnS (space group: Cmcm, No. 63). In recent years, it has become evident that a new polymorph of SnS exists based upon the cubic crystal system, known as π-SnS (space group: P213, No. 198).

Synthesis
Tin(II) sulfide can be prepared by reacting tin with sulfur, or tin(II) chloride with hydrogen sulfide.
Sn + S → SnS
SnCl2 + H2S → SnS + 2 HCl

Properties
Tin(II) sulfide is a dark brown or black solid, insoluble in water, but soluble in concentrated hydrochloric acid. Tin(II) sulfide is insoluble in (NH4)2S. It has a layer structure similar to that of black phosphorus. As per black phosphorus, tin(II) sulfide can be ultrasonically exfoliated in liquids to produce atomically thin semiconducting SnS sheets that have a wider optical band gap (>1.5 eV) compared to the bulk crystal.

Photovoltaic applications
Tin(II) sulfide is an interesting potential candidate for next generation thin-film solar cells. Currently, both cadmium telluride and CIGS (copper indium gallium selenide) are used as p-type absorber layers, but they are formulated from toxic, scarce constituents. Tin(II) sulfide, by contrast, is formed from cheap, earth abundant elements, and is nontoxic. This material also has a high optical absorption coefficient, p-type conductivity, and a mid range direct band gap of 1.3-1.4 eV, required electronic properties for this type of absorber layer. Based on the a detailed balance calculation using the material bandgap, the power conversion efficiency of a solar cell utilizing a tin(II) sulfide absorber layer could be as high as 32%, which is comparable to crystalline silicon. Finally, Tin(II) sulfide is stable in both alkaline and acidic conditions. All aforementioned characteristics suggest tin(II) sulfide as an interesting material to be used as a solar cell absorber layer.

At present, tin(II) sulfide thin films for use in photovoltaic cells are still in the research phase of development with power conversion efficiencies currently less than 5%.  Barriers for use include a low open circuit voltage and an inability to realize many of the above properties due to challenges in fabrication, but tin(II) sulfide still remains a promising material if these technical challenges are overcome.

References

Tin(II) compounds
Sulfides
Reducing agents
IV-VI semiconductors